"Ways To Be Wicked" is a song performed by Dove Cameron, Sofia Carson, Cameron Boyce, and Booboo Stewart in their vocal roles as  Mal, Evie, Carlos, and Jay from the Disney Channel Original Movie Descendants  2 (2017)

It premiered on Radio Disney and then was officially released as the Descendants 2 soundtrack's first single on April 14, 2017, by Walt Disney Records.

Live performances
On May 1, 2017 Cameron, Boyce, Stewart and Carson, introduced the theme in the show Dancing with the Stars along with the song "Rotten to the Core" belonging to the first soundtrack. On July 17, the cast performed a mashup of "Ways to Be Wicked" and "What's My Name", both original songs from the movie musical on Good Morning America.

Music video
The music video of "Ways to Be Wicked" was premiered on April 29, 2017 in the 2017 Radio Disney Music Awards in Microsoft Theater, Los Angeles. The video was directed by Kenny Ortega and released on April 30, 2017

Charts

Certifications

References

2017 singles
2017 songs
Walt Disney Records singles
Dove Cameron songs
Songs written by Sam Hollander
Songs from Descendants (franchise)
Sofia Carson songs